Thora Gerda Sofie Castenschiold (1 February 1882 – 30 January 1979) was a Danish tennis player at the beginning of the 20th century. She was the first woman to represent Denmark at the Olympics.

Career 
Castenschiold, a member of Copenhagen's KB, won the title at the first Danish women's tennis championships in 1906. She could defend it four times in a row until 1910.

She took part in the 1912 Summer Olympics at Stockholm and won the silver medal in the indoor singles competition.

References

External links
 
 

1882 births
1979 deaths
Danish female tennis players
Olympic silver medalists for Denmark
Olympic tennis players of Denmark
Tennis players at the 1912 Summer Olympics
Olympic medalists in tennis
Sportspeople from Copenhagen
Medalists at the 1912 Summer Olympics
20th-century Danish women